Sarojini Naidu Class Fast Patrol Vessels are series of seven Mid Shore Patrol Vessels built by Goa Shipyard Limited at Vasco da Gama, Goa for the Indian Coast Guard produced between 2002 and 2006.

Introduction 
The Sarojini class of watercraft are seagoing, high speed, armed surveillance platform, capable of shallow water operations.

These vessels are primarily designed for anti-smuggling operations, anti-terrorist deployment, fisheries protection and search and rescue operations. These vessels can also support the navy during wartime, as a coastal convoy escort and a communication link.

Design 
Powered by three 2,720 kW MTU diesel engines, driving independent Kamewa water-jets, these vessels are designed for good maneuverability and are capable of operating in up to Sea State 4 and can withstand Sea State 6. The vessels have a top speed of 35 knots and have an operational range of 1,500 nm. They are equipped with a 30 mm CRN 91 Naval Gun at forward with two 7.62 mm or 12.7 mm machine guns, each installed on both sides of the board.

They are fitted with the latest satellite communication and navigation systems including differential global positioning system (DGPS), electronic chart display and information system (ECDIS) and global maritime distress and safety system (GMDSS). They have air-conditioned accommodation for a crew of 35 and have endurance of 7 days. The vessels in this series are eco-friendly, featuring an on-board sewage treatment plant and the gases used for air-conditioning are ozone layer friendly.

Ships of the class

See also 
 Rajshree class
 Rani Abbaka class
 Priyadarshini Class
 Tarabai Class
 Rajhans Class
 Jijabai Class

References

External links 
 Article – Jane's
 Indian Coast Guard History

Fast attack craft of the Indian Coast Guard
Patrol boat classes
Ships of the Indian Coast Guard